Bodzęcin  is a village in the administrative district of Gmina Osina, within Goleniów County, West Pomeranian Voivodeship, in north-western Poland.

The village has a population of 220.

History
In the 10th century the region became part of the emerging Polish state. Following the fragmentation of Poland into smaller duchies, it formed part of the Duchy of Pomerania. From the 18th century it was part of Prussia, and from 1871 to 1945 it was also part of Germany. During World War II, a forced labour subcamp of the Nazi prison for youth in Nowogard was operated by the Germans in the village. After Germany's defeat in the war, in 1945, the area became again part of Poland.

References

Villages in Goleniów County